WMES-LP is a religious (Catholic) radio station serving the Altoona, Pennsylvania, market.  The station broadcasts current and previous Catholic masses and is strongly geared towards the Catholic religion.

References
 WMES-LP Official Website
 

MES-LP
MES-LP
Catholic radio stations
MES-LP
Radio stations established in 2004
2004 establishments in Pennsylvania